Phaeodactylibacter luteus  is a Gram-negative, aerobic and non-motile bacterium from the genus of Rubidimonas which has been isolated from the alga Picochlorum from the Indian Ocean.

References 

Bacteroidota
Bacteria described in 2015